

Events

Pre-1600
 438 – Roman emperor Theodosius II publishes the law codex Codex Theodosianus
 590 – Khosrau II is crowned king of Persia.
 706 – Byzantine emperor Justinian II has his predecessors Leontios and Tiberios III publicly executed in the Hippodrome of Constantinople.
1002 – At an assembly at Pavia of Lombard nobles, Arduin of Ivrea is restored to his domains and crowned King of Italy.
1113 – Pope Paschal II issues Pie Postulatio Voluntatis, recognizing the Order of Hospitallers.
1214 – During the Anglo-French War (1213–1214), an English invasion force led by John, King of England, lands at La Rochelle in France.
1493 – While on board the Niña, Christopher Columbus writes an open letter (widely distributed upon his return to Portugal) describing his discoveries and the unexpected items he came across in the New World.

1601–1900
1637 – Ferdinand III becomes Holy Roman Emperor.
1690 – Constantin Cantemir, Prince of Moldavia, and the Holy Roman Empire sign a secret treaty in Sibiu, stipulating that Moldavia would support the actions led by the House of Habsburg against the Ottoman Empire.
1764 – The city of St. Louis is established in Spanish Louisiana (now in Missouri, USA).
1798 – The Roman Republic is proclaimed after Louis-Alexandre Berthier, a general of Napoleon, had invaded the city of Rome five days earlier.
1835 – Serbia's Sretenje Constitution briefly comes into effect.
1862 – American Civil War: Confederates commanded by Brig. Gen. John B. Floyd attack General Ulysses S. Grant's Union forces besieging Fort Donelson in Tennessee. Unable to break the fort's encirclement, the Confederates surrender the following day.
1870 – Stevens Institute of Technology is founded in New Jersey, US, and offers the first Bachelor of Engineering degree in mechanical engineering.
1879 – Women's rights: US President Rutherford B. Hayes signs a bill allowing female attorneys to argue cases before the Supreme Court of the United States.
1898 – The battleship  explodes and sinks in Havana harbor in Cuba, killing about 274 of the ship's roughly 354 crew. The disaster pushes the United States to declare war on Spain.
1899 – Tsar Nicholas II of Russia issues a declaration known as the February Manifesto, which reduces the autonomy of the Grand Duchy of Finland, thus beginning the first period of oppression.

1901–present
1909 – The Flores Theater fire in Acapulco, Mexico kills 250.
1923 – Greece becomes the last European country to adopt the Gregorian calendar.
1925 – The 1925 serum run to Nome: The second delivery of serum arrives in Nome, Alaska.
1933 – In Miami, Giuseppe Zangara attempts to assassinate US President-elect Franklin D. Roosevelt, but instead shoots Chicago mayor Anton J. Cermak, who dies of his wounds on March 6.
1942 – World War II: Fall of Singapore. Following an assault by Japanese forces, the British General Arthur Percival surrenders. About 80,000 Indian, United Kingdom and Australian soldiers become prisoners of war, the largest surrender of British-led military personnel in history.
1944 – World War II: The assault on Monte Cassino, Italy begins.
  1944   – World War II: The Narva Offensive begins.
1945 – World War II: Third day of bombing in Dresden.
1946 – ENIAC, the first electronic general-purpose computer, is formally dedicated at the University of Pennsylvania in Philadelphia.
1949 – Gerald Lankester Harding and Roland de Vaux begin excavations at Cave 1 of the Qumran Caves, where they will eventually discover the first seven Dead Sea Scrolls.
1952 – King George VI of the United Kingdom is buried in St George's Chapel, Windsor Castle.
1954 – Canada and the United States agree to construct the Distant Early Warning Line, a system of radar stations in the far northern Arctic regions of Canada and Alaska.
1961 – Sabena Flight 548 crashes in Belgium, killing 73, including the entire United States figure skating team along with several of their coaches and family members.
1965 – A new red-and-white maple leaf design is adopted as the flag of Canada, replacing the old Canadian Red Ensign banner.
1971 – The decimalisation of the currencies of the United Kingdom and Ireland is completed on Decimal Day.
1972 – Sound recordings are granted U.S. federal copyright protection for the first time.
  1972   – José María Velasco Ibarra, serving as President of Ecuador for the fifth time, is overthrown by the military for the fourth time.
1982 – The drilling rig Ocean Ranger sinks during a storm off the coast of Newfoundland, killing 84 workers.
1989 – Soviet–Afghan War: The Soviet Union officially announces that all of its troops have left Afghanistan.
1991 – The Visegrád Group, establishing cooperation to move toward free-market systems, is signed by the leaders of Czechoslovakia, Hungary and Poland.
1992 – Serial killer Jeffrey Dahmer is sentenced in Milwaukee to 15 terms of life in prison.
  1992   – Air Transport International Flight 805 crashes in Swanton, Ohio, near Toledo Express Airport, killing all four people on board.
1996 – At the Xichang Satellite Launch Center in China, a Long March 3B rocket, carrying an Intelsat 708, veers off course and crashes into a rural village after liftoff, killing somewhere between six and 100 people.
  1996   – The Embassy of the United States, Athens, is attacked by an antitank rocket, launched by the Revolutionary Organization 17 November.
2001 – The first draft of the complete human genome is published in Nature.
2003 – Protests against the Iraq war take place in over 600 cities worldwide. It is estimated that between eight million and 30 million people participate, making this the largest peace demonstration in history.
2010 – Two trains collide in the Halle train collision in Halle, Belgium, killing 19 and injuring 171 people.
2012 – Three hundred and sixty people die in a fire at a Honduran prison in the city of Comayagua.
2013 – A meteor explodes over Russia, injuring 1,500 people as a shock wave blows out windows and rocks buildings. This happens unexpectedly only hours before the expected closest ever approach of the larger and unrelated asteroid 2012 DA14.
2021 – Sixty people drown and hundreds are missing after a boat sinks on the Congo River near the village of Longola Ekoti, Mai-Ndombe Province, Democratic Republic of the Congo.

Births

Pre-1600
1377 – Ladislaus of Naples (d. 1414)
1458 – Ivan the Young, son of Ivan III of Russia (d. 1490)
1472 – Piero the Unfortunate, Italian ruler (d. 1503)
1506 – Juliana of Stolberg, German countess (d. 1580)
1519 – Pedro Menéndez de Avilés, first Spanish Governor of Florida (d. 1574)
1557 – Alfonso Fontanelli, Italian composer (d. 1622)
1564 – Galileo Galilei, Italian astronomer, physicist, and mathematician (d. 1642)

1601–1900
1612 – Paul de Chomedey, Sieur de Maisonneuve, French soldier, founded Montreal (d. 1676)
1627 – Charles Morton, Cornish nonconformist minister (d. 1698)
1638 – Zeb-un-Nissa, Mughal princess and poet (d. 1702)
1705 – Charles-André van Loo, French painter (d. 1765)
1710 – Louis XV of France (d. 1774)
1725 – Abraham Clark, American surveyor, lawyer, and politician (d. 1794)
1734 – William Stacy, American colonel (d. 1802)
1739 – Alexandre-Théodore Brongniart, French architect, designed the Paris Bourse (d. 1813)
1748 – Jeremy Bentham, English jurist and philosopher (d. 1832)
1759 – Friedrich August Wolf, German philologist and critic (d. 1824)
1760 – Jean-François Le Sueur, French composer and educator (d. 1837)
1809 – André Dumont, Belgian geologist and academic (d. 1857)
  1809   – Cyrus McCormick, American journalist and businessman, co-founded International Harvester (d. 1884)
1810 – Mary S. B. Shindler, American poet, writer, and editor (d. 1883)
1811 – Domingo Faustino Sarmiento, Argentinian journalist and politician, 7th President of Argentina (d. 1888)
1812 – Charles Lewis Tiffany, American businessman, founded Tiffany & Co. (d. 1902)
1820 – Susan B. Anthony, American suffragist and activist (d. 1906)
1825 – Carter Harrison, Sr., American lawyer and politician, 29th Mayor of Chicago (d. 1893)
1834 – V. A. Urechia, Moldavian-Romanian historian, author, and playwright (d. 1901)
1835 – Demetrius Vikelas, Greek businessman and philanthropist (d. 1908)
1840 – Titu Maiorescu, Romanian philosopher, academic, and politician, 23rd Prime Minister of Romania (d. 1917)
1841 – Manuel Ferraz de Campos Sales, Brazilian lawyer and politician, 4th President of Brazil (d. 1913)
1845 – Elihu Root, American lawyer and politician, 38th United States Secretary of State, Nobel Prize laureate (d. 1937)
1847 – Robert Fuchs, Austrian composer and educator (d. 1927)
1849 – Rickman Godlee, English surgeon and academic (d. 1925)
1850 – Sophie Bryant, Irish mathematician, academic and activist (d. 1922)
1851 – Spiru Haret, Romanian mathematician, astronomer, and politician, 55th Romanian Minister of Internal Affairs (d. 1912)
1856 – Emil Kraepelin, German psychiatrist and academic (d. 1926)
1861 – Charles Édouard Guillaume, Swiss-French physicist and academic, Nobel Prize laureate (d. 1938)
  1861   – Alfred North Whitehead, English mathematician and philosopher (d. 1947)
1873 – Hans von Euler-Chelpin, German-Swedish biochemist and academic, Nobel Prize laureate (d. 1964)
1874 – Ernest Shackleton, Anglo-Irish captain and explorer (d. 1922)
1883 – Sax Rohmer, English-American author (d. 1959)
1890 – Robert Ley, German politician (d. 1945)
1892 – James Forrestal, American lieutenant and politician, 1st United States Secretary of Defense (d. 1949)
1893 – Roman Najuch, Polish professional tennis player (d. 1967)
1897 – Gerrit Kleerekoper, Dutch gymnast and coach (d. 1943)
1898 – Totò, Italian actor, singer, and screenwriter (d. 1967)
1899 – Georges Auric, French composer (d. 1983)
  1899   – Gale Sondergaard, Danish-American actress (d. 1985)

1901–present
1904 – Mary Adshead, English painter (d. 1995)
  1904   – Antonin Magne, French cyclist and manager (d. 1983)
1905 – Harold Arlen, American composer (d. 1986)
1907 – Jean Langlais, French organist and composer (d. 1991)
  1907   – Cesar Romero, American actor (d. 1994)
1908 – Sarto Fournier, Canadian lawyer and politician, 38th Mayor of Montreal (d. 1980)
1909 – Miep Gies, Austrian-Dutch humanitarian, helped hide Anne Frank and her family (d. 2010)
1910 – Irena Sendler, Polish nurse and humanitarian, Righteous Gentile (d. 2008)
1912 – George Mikes, Hungarian-English journalist and author (d. 1987)
1913 – Erich Eliskases, Austrian chess player (d. 1997)
1914 – Hale Boggs, American lawyer and politician (d. 1972)
  1914   – Kevin McCarthy, American actor (d. 2010)
1916 – Mary Jane Croft, American actress (d. 1999)
1918 – Allan Arbus, American actor and photographer (d. 2013)
  1918   – Hank Locklin, American singer-songwriter and guitarist (d. 2009)
1919 – Ducky Detweiler, American baseball player and manager (d. 2013)
1920 – Endicott Peabody, American soldier, lawyer, and politician, 62nd Governor of Massachusetts (d. 1997)
  1920   – Eio Sakata, Japanese Go player (d. 2010)
1922 – John B. Anderson, Swedish-American lawyer and politician (d. 2017)
1923 – Yelena Bonner, Soviet-Russian activist (d. 2011)
1924 – Robert Drew, American director and producer (d. 2014)
1925 – Angella D. Ferguson, American pediatrician
1927 – Frank Dunlop, English actor and director
  1927   – Harvey Korman, American actor and comedian (d. 2008)
  1927   – Yehoshua Neuwirth, Israeli rabbi and scholar (d. 2013)
1928 – Joseph Willcox Jenkins, American composer, conductor, and educator (d. 2014)
1929 – Graham Hill, English racing driver and businessman (d. 1975)
  1929   – James R. Schlesinger, American economist and politician, 12th United States Secretary of Defense (d. 2014)
1930 – Bruce Dawe, Australian poet and academic (d. 2020)
1931 – Claire Bloom, English actress
  1931   – Jonathan Steele, English journalist and author
1934 – Jimmy Bloomfield,  English footballer and manager (d. 1983)
  1934   – Graham Kennedy, Australian television host and actor (d. 2005)
  1934   – Niklaus Wirth, Swiss computer scientist, created the Pascal programming language
  1934   – Abe Woodson, American football player and minister (d. 2014)
1935 – Susan Brownmiller, American journalist and author
  1935   – Roger B. Chaffee, American lieutenant, engineer, and astronaut (d. 1967)
  1935   – Gene Hickerson, American football player (d. 2008)
1937 – Gregory Mcdonald, American author (d. 2008)
  1937   – Coen Moulijn, Dutch footballer (d. 2011)
1940 – İsmail Cem İpekçi, Turkish journalist and politician, 45th Turkish Minister of Foreign Affairs (d. 2007)
  1940   – Hamzah Haz, Indonesian journalist and politician, 9th Vice President of Indonesia
1941 – Florinda Bolkan, Brazilian actress
  1941   – Brian Holland, American songwriter and producer
1945 – Jack Dann, American-Australian author and poet
  1945   – Douglas Hofstadter, American author and academic
1946 – John Trudell, American author, poet, and actor (d. 2015)
  1946   – Clare Short, English civil servant and politician, Secretary of State for International Development
1947 – John Adams, American composer
  1947   – Marisa Berenson, American model and actress
1948 – Art Spiegelman, Swedish-American cartoonist and critic
1949 – Ken Anderson, American football player
1951 – Markku Alén, Finnish racing driver
  1951   – Melissa Manchester, American singer-songwriter and actress 
  1951   – Jane Seymour, English-American actress, producer, and jewelry designer
1952 – Tomislav Nikolić, Serbian politician, 4th President of Serbia
  1952   – Nikolai Sorokin, Russian actor and director (d. 2013)
1953 – Ernie Howe, English footballer and manager
  1953   – Lynn Whitfield, American actress and producer
1954 – Matt Groening, American animator, producer, and screenwriter
1955 – Janice Dickinson, American model, agent, and author 
  1955   – Christopher McDonald, American actor
1956 – Desmond Haynes, Barbadian cricketer and coach
  1956   – Ann Westin, Swedish comedian
1958 – Chrystine Brouillet, Canadian author
  1958   – Tony McKegney, Canadian ice hockey player
  1958   – Matthew Ward, American singer-songwriter 
1959 – Ali Campbell, English singer-songwriter and guitarist 
  1959   – Brian Propp, Canadian ice hockey player and sportscaster
  1959   – Hugo Savinovich, Ecuadorian wrestler and sportscaster
1960 – Darrell Green, American football player
  1960   – Jock Hobbs, New Zealand rugby player (d. 2012)
1962 – Milo Đukanović, Montenegrin politician, 29th Prime Minister of Montenegro
1964 – Chris Farley, American comedian and actor (d. 1997)
  1964   – Leland D. Melvin, American engineer and astronaut
  1964   – Mark Price, American basketball player and coach
1965 – Craig Matthews, South African cricketer
1967 – Jane Child, Canadian singer-songwriter and producer
  1967   – Syed Kamall, English academic and politician
  1967   – Craig Simpson, Canadian ice hockey player and sportscaster
1969 – Birdman, American rapper and producer
1970 – Shepard Fairey, American artist and activist
1971 – Alex Borstein, American actress, voice artist, producer, and screenwriter
  1971   – Renee O'Connor, American actress, director, and producer
1972 – Jaromír Jágr, Czech ice hockey player
1973 – Kateřina Neumannová, Czech skier
  1973   – Amy van Dyken, American swimmer
1974 – Miranda July, American actress, director, and screenwriter
  1974   – Ugueth Urbina, Venezuelan baseball player
  1974   – Alexander Wurz, Austrian racing driver and businessman
1975 – Serge Aubin, Canadian ice hockey player and coach
  1975   – Annemarie Kramer, Dutch sprinter
  1975   – Brendon Small, American animator, producer, screenwriter, and actor
1976 – Brandon Boyd, American singer-songwriter 
  1976   – Óscar Freire, Spanish cyclist
1979 – Hamish Marshall, New Zealand cricketer
  1979   – James Marshall, New Zealand cricketer
1980 – Conor Oberst, American singer-songwriter 
1981 – Heurelho Gomes, Brazilian international footballer
  1981   – Matt Hoopes, American singer-songwriter and guitarist 
  1981   – Rita Jeptoo, Kenyan runner
  1981   – Diego Martínez, Mexican footballer
  1981   – Vivek Shraya, Canadian singer and songwriter
1982 – Shameka Christon, American basketball player
  1982   – James Yap, Filipino basketball player
1983 – Don Cowie, Scottish footballer
  1983   – David Degen, Swiss footballer
  1983   – Philipp Degen, Swiss footballer
  1983   – Russell Martin, Canadian baseball player
1985 – Serkan Kırıntılı, Turkish footballer
1986 – Valeri Bojinov, Bulgarian footballer
  1986   – Johnny Cueto, Dominican baseball player
  1986   – Amber Riley, American actress and singer
  1986   – Laura Sallés, Andorran judoka
1987 – Jarrod Sammut, Australian rugby league player
1988 – Tim Mannah, Australian-born Lebanese rugby league player
  1988   – Rui Patrício, Portuguese footballer
  1988   – Papu Gómez, Argentine footballer
1991 – Ángel Sepúlveda, Mexican footballer
1993 – Ravi, South Korean rapper
1994 – Sodapoppin, American Twitch streamer and Internet personality
1995 – Megan Thee Stallion, American rapper
1997 – Derrick Jones Jr., American basketball player
1998 – George Russell, English racing driver
2001 – Brad Schneider, Australian rugby league player

Deaths

Pre-1600
 670 – Oswiu, king of Northumbria (b. c. 612)
 706 – Leontios, Byzantine emperor
   706   – Tiberios III, Byzantine emperor
 815 – Ibn Tabataba, Zaydi anti-caliph
 956 – Su Yugui, Chinese chancellor (b. 895)
1043 – Gisela of Swabia, Holy Roman Empress (b. 990)
1145 – Lucius II, pope of the Catholic Church
1152 – Conrad III, king of Germany (b. 1093)
1382 – William de Ufford, 2nd Earl of Suffolk (b. c. 1339)
1417 – Richard de Vere, 11th Earl of Oxford, English commander (b. 1385)
1508 – Giovanni II Bentivoglio, tyrant of Bologna (b. 1443)
1600 – José de Acosta, Spanish Jesuit missionary and naturalist (b. 1540)

1601–1900
1621 – Michael Praetorius, German organist and composer (b. 1571)
1637 – Ferdinand II, Holy Roman Emperor (b. 1578)
1738 – Matthias Braun, Czech sculptor (b. 1684)
1781 – Gotthold Ephraim Lessing, German philosopher, author, and critic (b. 1729)
1818 – Frederick Louis, Prince of Hohenlohe-Ingelfingen (b. 1746)
1835 – Henry Hunt, English farmer and politician (b. 1773)
1839 – François-Marie-Thomas Chevalier de Lorimier, Canadian rebel (b. 1803)
1842 – Archibald Menzies, Scottish surgeon and botanist (b. 1754)
1844 – Henry Addington, 1st Viscount Sidmouth, English politician, Prime Minister of the United Kingdom (b. 1757)
1847 – Germinal Pierre Dandelin, Belgian mathematician and engineer (b. 1794)
1848 – Hermann von Boyen, Prussian general and politician, Prussian Minister of War (b. 1771)
1849 – Pierre François Verhulst, Belgian mathematician and theorist (b. 1804)
1857 – Mikhail Glinka, Russian composer (b. 1804)
1869 – Ghalib, Indian poet and educator (b. 1796)
1885 – Gregor von Helmersen, Estonian-Russian geologist and engineer (b. 1803)
  1885   – Leopold Damrosch, German-American composer and conductor (b. 1832)
1897 – Dimitrie Ghica, Romanian lawyer and politician, 10th Prime Minister of Romania (b. 1816)

1901–present
1905 – Lew Wallace, American author, general, and politician, 11th Governor of New Mexico Territory (b. 1827)
1911 – Theodor Escherich, German-Austrian pediatrician and academic (b. 1859)
1924 – Lionel Monckton, English composer (b. 1861)
1928 – H. H. Asquith, English lawyer and politician, Prime Minister of the United Kingdom (b. 1852)
1932 – Minnie Maddern Fiske, American actress and playwright (b. 1865)
1933 – Pat Sullivan, Australian animator and producer, co-created Felix the Cat (b. 1887)
1939 – Kuzma Petrov-Vodkin, Russian painter and author (b. 1878)
1956 – Vincent de Moro-Giafferi, French lawyer and politician (b. 1878)
1959 – Owen Willans Richardson, English physicist and academic, Nobel Prize laureate (b. 1879)
1961 – Laurence Owen, American figure skater (b. 1944)
1965 – Nat King Cole, American singer and pianist (b. 1919)
1966 – Gerard Antoni Ciołek, Polish architect and historian (b. 1909)
  1966   – Camilo Torres Restrepo, Colombian priest and theologian (b. 1929)
1967 – Antonio Moreno, Spanish-American actor and director (b. 1887)
1970 – Hugh Dowding, 1st Baron Dowding, Scottish air marshal (b. 1882)
1973 – Wally Cox, American actor (b. 1924)
1974 – Kurt Atterberg, Swedish composer and engineer (b. 1887)
1981 – Mike Bloomfield, American guitarist and songwriter (b. 1943)
  1981   – Karl Richter, German organist and conductor (b. 1926)
1984 – Ethel Merman, American actress and singer (b. 1908)
1988 – Richard Feynman, American physicist and academic, Nobel Prize laureate (b. 1918)
1992 – María Elena Moyano, Peruvian activist (b. 1960)
  1992   – William Schuman, American composer and academic (b. 1910)
1996 – McLean Stevenson, American actor (b. 1929)
1998 – Martha Gellhorn, American journalist and author (b. 1908)
1999 – Henry Way Kendall, American physicist and mountaineer, Nobel Prize laureate (b. 1926)
2000 – Angus MacLean, Canadian commander and politician, 25th Premier of Prince Edward Island (b. 1914)
2002 – Howard K. Smith, American journalist and actor (b. 1914)
  2002   – Kevin Smith, New Zealand actor (b. 1963)
2004 – Jens Evensen, Norwegian lawyer, judge, and politician, Norwegian Minister of Trade (b. 1917)
2005 – Pierre Bachelet, French singer-songwriter (b. 1944)
  2005   – Sam Francis, American historian and journalist (b. 1947)
2007 – Walker Edmiston, American actor (b. 1925)
  2007   – Ray Evans, American songwriter (b. 1915)
2008 – Johnny Weaver, American wrestler and sportscaster (b. 1935)
2010 – Jeanne M. Holm, American general (b. 1921)
2012 – Cyril Domb, English-Israeli physicist and academic (b. 1920)
2013 – Sanan Kachornprasart, Thai general and politician (b. 1935)
  2013   – Ahmed Rajib Haider, Bangladeshi atheist blogger
2014 – Thelma Estrin, American computer scientist and engineer (b. 1924)
  2014   – Christopher Malcolm, Scottish-Canadian actor, director, and producer (b. 1946)
2015 – Haron Amin, Afghan diplomat, Afghan Ambassador to Japan (b. 1969)
  2015   – Arnaud de Borchgrave, American journalist and author (b. 1926)
  2015   – Steve Montador, Canadian ice hockey player (b. 1979)
2016 – George Gaynes, Finnish-American actor (b. 1917)
  2016   – Vanity, Canadian-American singer-songwriter, dancer, and actress (b. 1959) 
2017 – Stuart McLean, Canadian radio broadcaster (b. 1948)
2019 – Lee Radziwill, American socialite (b. 1933)
2020 – Caroline Flack, English actress and TV presenter (b. 1979)
2022 – Bappi Lahiri, Indian singer, composer and record producer (b. 1952)
2023 – Raquel Welch, American actress and singer (b. 1940)

Holidays and observances
 Christian feast day:
 Blessed Michał Sopoćko
 Claude de la Colombière
 Faustinus and Jovita
 Oswiu
 Quinidius
 Sigfrid of Sweden
 Thomas Bray (Episcopal Church)
 Walfrid
 February 15 (Eastern Orthodox liturgics)
Earliest day on which Family Day can fall, while February 21 is the latest; celebrated on the third Monday in February. (parts of Canada)
Earliest day on which Washington's Birthday can fall, while February 21 is the latest; celebrated on the third Monday in February. (United States)
 International Duties Memorial Day (Russia, regional)
 John Frum Day (Vanuatu)
 Liberation Day (Afghanistan)
 National Flag of Canada Day (Canada)
 Parinirvana Day, also celebrated on February 8. (Mahayana Buddhism)
 Singles Awareness Day
 Statehood Day (Serbia)
 Susan B. Anthony Day (Florida, United States)
 The ENIAC Day (Philadelphia, United States)
 Total Defence Day (Singapore)

References

External links

 BBC: On This Day
 
 Historical Events on February 15

Days of the year
February